The Conquérant was a Bucentaure-class 80-gun ship of the line of the French Navy, designed by Sané.

She was commissioned in Anvers under Captain Lafond in the Scheldt squadron. Following the Bourbon Restoration, she was sent to Brest, where she underwent a refit in 1821, and was sent to Toulon in 1824. She took part in the Morea expedition in 1827. She was damaged by fire at Smyrna, Russia, on 29 October 1829. She participated in the Invasion of Algiers in 1830.

In November 1830, she was disarmed in Toulon, and was struck the next year. From 1830, she was used as a barracks hulk, until 1842, when she was broken up.

References

 Jean-Michel Roche, Dictionnaire des Bâtiments de la flotte de guerre française de Colbert à nos jours, tome I

Ships of the line of the French Navy
Ships built in France
Bucentaure-class ships of the line
1812 ships
Maritime incidents in October 1829